Vanguardia is a Cuban newspaper. It is published in Spanish, with online English, French, Portuguese and Italian pages.
The newspaper is located in Santa Clara.

External links 
 Vanguardia online 

Newspapers published in Cuba
Publications with year of establishment missing
Mass media in Santa Clara, Cuba